The Consensus 1985 College Basketball All-American team, as determined by aggregating the results of four major All-American teams.  To earn "consensus" status, a player must win honors from a majority of the following teams: the Associated Press, the USBWA, The United Press International and the National Association of Basketball Coaches.

1985 Consensus All-America team

Individual All-America teams

AP Honorable Mention:

Mark Acres, Oral Roberts
Michael Adams, Boston College
Richie Adams, UNLV
Rafael Addison, Syracuse
Leonard Allen, San Diego State
Jaye Andrews, Bucknell
Eddie Archie, Alcorn State
Mitch Arnold, Fresno State
Terrance Bailey, Wagner
John Bajusz, Cornell
Ken Bantum, Cornell
Andre Battle, Loyola Chicago
John Battle, Rutgers
William Bedford, Memphis State
Benoit Benjamin, Creighton
Walter Berry, St. John's
Uwe Blab, Indiana
Steve Black, La Salle
Jim Bolger, Rider
Eric Boyd, North Carolina A&T
Charlie Bradley, South Florida
Aaron Brandon, Alcorn State
Perry Bromwell, Penn
Michael Brooks, Tennessee
Jimmy Brown, North Carolina A&T
Mike Brown, George Washington
Jim Bullock, Purdue
Luther Burden, Saint Louis
Vernon Butler, Navy
Bernard Campbell, Delaware State
Shawn Campbell, Weber State
Wayne Carlander, USC
Joe Carrabino, Harvard
Terry Catledge, South Alabama
Lorenzo Charles, NC State
Keith Cieplicki, William & Mary
Michael Clark, Little Rock
Fred Cofield, Eastern Michigan
Jon Collins, Eastern Illinois
David Cooke, St. Mary's
Kim Cooksey, Middle Tennessee
Tyrone Corbin, DePaul
Phil Cox, Vanderbilt
Randy Cozzens, Army
Dell Curry, Virginia Tech
Ivan Daniels, UIC
Brad Daugherty, North Carolina
Tony Duckett, Lafayette
Joe Dumars, McNeese State
Gay Elmore, VMI
Matt England, Houston Baptist
Ken Epperson, Toledo
Jerry Everett, Lamar
Alvin Franklin, Houston
Kenny Gattison, Old Dominion
Derrick Gervin, UTSA
Luster Goodwin, UTEP
Greg Grant, Utah State
Anthony Grier, Kent State
Granger Hall, Temple
Ray Hall, Canisius
Jeff Hamilton, Saint Francis (PA)
Tony Hargraves, lona
Ron Harper, Miami (Ohio)
Steve Harris, Tulsa
Arthur Hayes, Northeast Louisiana
Skip Henderson, Marshall
Curtis High, Nevada
Dave Hoppen, Nebraska
Bubba Jennings, Texas Tech
Harold Keeling, Santa Clara
Ron Kellogg, Kansas
John Keshock, Youngstown State
Stephen Kite, Tennessee Tech
Joe Kleine, Arkansas
Randy Kraayenbrink, Northern Iowa
Larry Krystkowiak, Montana
Derrick Lamar, Rider
Rolando Lamb, VCU
Anicet Lavodrama, Houston Baptist
Ralph Lewis, La Salle
Reggie Lewis, Northeastern
Quinton Lytle, Western Carolina
Karl Malone, Louisiana Tech
Bill Martin, Georgetown
Maurice Martin, St. Joseph's
Bob McCann, Morehead State
Eugene McDowell, Florida
Tony McIntosh, Fordham
Sam Mitchell, Mercer
Steve Mitchell, UAB
Vernon Moore, Creighton
Tod Murphy, UC Irvine
Tony Neal, Cal State Fullerton
Johnny Newman, Richmond
Dennis Nutt, TCU
Dan Palombizio, Ball State
Sylvester Parson, South Carolina State
Kenny Patterson, DePaul
Chuck Person, Auburn
Nelson Peterson, Idaho State
Mike Phelps, Alcorn State
Ed Pinckney, Villanova
Doug Poetzsch, Siena
Dwayne Polee, Pepperdine
Daren Queenan, Lehigh
Dwayne Randall, Nevada
Clinton Ransey, Cleveland State
Blair Rasmussen, Oregon
Charles Rayne, Temple
Art Redmond, Wagner
David Rivers, Notre Dame
David Robinson, Navy
Bryan Roth, Akron
Timo Saarelainen, BYU
Robert Sanders, Mississippi Valley State
Detlef Schrempf, Washington
Carey Scurry, LIU
Willie Simmons, Louisiana Tech
Clinton Smith, Cleveland State
Juden Smith, UTEP
Keith Smith, Loyola Marymount
Mike Smrek, Canisius
Dominic Snowden, Delaware State
Barry Stevens, Iowa State
Greg Stokes, Iowa
Shawn Teague, Boston University
Malcolm Thomas, Missouri
Billy Thompson, Louisville
Regan Truesdale, The Citadel
Chad Tucker, Butler
Tom Undermon, Robert Morris
Nick Vanos, Santa Clara
Earl Walker, Mercer
Anthony Watson, San Diego State
Gerald Wilkins, Chattanooga
Joe Williams, Alabama State
John Sherman Williams, Indiana State
John Williams, Tulane
Pete Williams, Arizona
Carlos Yates, George Mason
Perry Young, Virginia Tech

References

NCAA Men's Basketball All-Americans
All-Americans